The 1980–81 season was the 11th season of the Portland Trail Blazers in the National Basketball Association (NBA). The Blazers won seven more games than the previous season, ending with a record of 45–37 and making the playoffs for the fifth consecutive season.

The Blazers were eliminated from the 1981 NBA Playoffs after losing their best-of-three first-round series to the Kansas City Kings, two games to one.

Draft picks

Note:  This is not a complete list; only the first two rounds are covered, as well as any other picks by the franchise who played at least one NBA game.

Roster

Regular season

Season standings

z – clinched division title
y – clinched division title
x – clinched playoff spot

Record vs. opponents

Game log

Regular season

|- align="center" bgcolor="#ffcccc"
| 1
| October 10
| @ Utah
| L 86–96
|
|
|
| Salt Palace Acord Arena
| 0–1
|- align="center" bgcolor="#ccffcc"
| 2
| October 12
| Seattle
| W 107–96
|
|
|
| Memorial Coliseum
| 1–1
|- align="center" bgcolor="#ffcccc"
| 3
| October 15
| @ Golden State
| L 92–95
|
|
|
| Oakland–Alameda County Coliseum Arena
| 1–2
|- align="center" bgcolor="#ffcccc"
| 4
| October 17
| Houston
| L 99–102
|
|
|
| Memorial Coliseum
| 1–3
|- align="center" bgcolor="#ccffcc"
| 5
| October 21
| Los Angeles
| W 107–103
|
|
|
| Memorial Coliseum
| 2–3
|- align="center" bgcolor="#ccffcc"
| 6
| October 24
| Dallas
| W 120–105
|
|
|
| Memorial Coliseum
| 3–3
|- align="center" bgcolor="#ffcccc"
| 7
| October 26
| @ Seattle
| L 98–111
|
|
|
| Kingdome
| 3–4
|- align="center" bgcolor="#ffcccc"
| 8
| October 28
| @ San Antonio
| L 112–120
|
|
|
| HemisFair Arena
| 3–5
|- align="center" bgcolor="#ffcccc"
| 9
| October 29
| @ Kansas City
| L 98–115
|
|
|
| Kemper Arena
| 3–6

|- align="center" bgcolor="#ffcccc"
| 10
| November 1
| Utah
| L 87–95
|
|
|
| Memorial Coliseum
| 3–7
|- align="center" bgcolor="#ccffcc"
| 11
| November 2
| Cleveland
| W 102–96
|
|
|
| Memorial Coliseum
| 4–7
|- align="center" bgcolor="#ffcccc"
| 12
| November 4
| @ Los Angeles
| L 118–119
|
|
|
| The Forum
| 4–8
|- align="center" bgcolor="#ccffcc"
| 13
| November 7
| Golden State
| W 122–113
|
|
|
| Memorial Coliseum
| 5–8
|- align="center" bgcolor="#ffcccc"
| 14
| November 8
| San Diego
| L 106–110 (OT)
|
|
|
| Memorial Coliseum
| 5–9
|- align="center" bgcolor="#ffcccc"
| 15
| November 11
| Kansas City
| L 101–102
|
|
|
| Memorial Coliseum
| 5–10
|- align="center" bgcolor="#ffcccc"
| 16
| November 14
| @ Dallas
| L 106–113
|
|
|
| Reunion Arena
| 5–11
|- align="center" bgcolor="#ffcccc"
| 17
| November 15
| @ Denver
| L 123–125
|
|
|
| McNichols Sports Arena
| 5–12
|- align="center" bgcolor="#ffcccc"
| 18
| November 16
| @ Phoenix
| L 107–119
|
|
|
| Arizona Veterans Memorial Coliseum
| 5–13
|- align="center" bgcolor="#ccffcc"
| 19
| November 18
| Denver
| W 122–103
|
|
|
| Memorial Coliseum
| 6–13
|- align="center" bgcolor="#ffcccc"
| 20
| November 20
| Milwaukee
| L 93–97
|
|
|
| Memorial Coliseum
| 6–14
|- align="center" bgcolor="#ccffcc"
| 21
| November 23
| Dallas
| W 116–96
|
|
|
| Memorial Coliseum
| 7–14
|- align="center" bgcolor="#ffcccc"
| 22
| November 25
| @ Atlanta
| L 108–112
|
|
|
| The Omni
| 7–15
|- align="center" bgcolor="#ffcccc"
| 23
| November 26
| @ Boston
| L 101–126
|
|
|
| Boston Garden
| 7–16
|- align="center" bgcolor="#ffcccc"
| 24
| November 28
| @ Philadelphia
| L 103–116
|
|
|
| The Spectrum
| 7–17
|- align="center" bgcolor="#ffcccc"
| 25
| November 29
| @ New York
| L 110–111
|
|
|
| Madison Square Garden
| 7–18

|- align="center" bgcolor="#ffcccc"
| 26
| December 2
| New Jersey
| L 105–118
|
|
|
| Memorial Coliseum
| 7–19
|- align="center" bgcolor="#ccffcc"
| 27
| December 4
| @ San Diego
| W 103–100
|
|
|
| San Diego Sports Arena
| 8–19
|- align="center" bgcolor="#ccffcc"
| 28
| December 5
| Chicago
| W 116–115
|
|
|
| Memorial Coliseum
| 9–19
|- align="center" bgcolor="#ccffcc"
| 29
| December 7
| San Antonio
| W 116–115
|
|
|
| Memorial Coliseum
| 10–19
|- align="center" bgcolor="#ccffcc"
| 30
| December 9
| Seattle
| W 111–98
|
|
|
| Memorial Coliseum
| 11–19
|- align="center" bgcolor="#ccffcc"
| 31
| December 12
| Houston
| W 106–100
|
|
|
| Memorial Coliseum
| 12–19
|- align="center" bgcolor="#ccffcc"
| 32
| December 14
| @ Phoenix
| W 116–110
|
|
|
| Arizona Veterans Memorial Coliseum
| 13–19
|- align="center" bgcolor="#ccffcc"
| 33
| December 17
| @ Golden State
| W 115–113
|
|
|
| Oakland–Alameda County Coliseum Arena
| 14–19
|- align="center" bgcolor="#ccffcc"
| 34
| December 19
| @ Los Angeles
| W 110–106
|
|
|
| The Forum
| 15–19
|- align="center" bgcolor="#ccffcc"
| 35
| December 20
| Atlanta
| W 122–119 (OT)
|
|
|
| Memorial Coliseum
| 16–19
|- align="center" bgcolor="#ffcccc"
| 36
| December 21
| Phoenix
| L 100–111
|
|
|
| Memorial Coliseum
| 16–20
|- align="center" bgcolor="#ccffcc"
| 37
| December 23
| Los Angeles
| W 108–102
|
|
|
| Memorial Coliseum
| 17–20
|- align="center" bgcolor="#ccffcc"
| 38
| December 25
| Golden State
| W 115–114
|
|
|
| Memorial Coliseum
| 18–20
|- align="center" bgcolor="#ccffcc"
| 39
| December 26
| @ Seattle
| W 96–90
|
|
|
| Kingdome
| 19–20
|- align="center" bgcolor="#ccffcc"
| 40
| December 30
| Philadelphia
| W 109–108
|
|
|
| Memorial Coliseum
| 20–20

|- align="center" bgcolor="#ccffcc"
| 41
| January 1
| Denver
| W 122–119
|
|
|
| Memorial Coliseum
| 21–20
|- align="center" bgcolor="#ffcccc"
| 42
| January 3
| @ Utah
| L 103–109
|
|
|
| Salt Palace Acord Arena
| 21–21
|- align="center" bgcolor="#ffcccc"
| 43
| January 4
| Boston
| L 111–120
|
|
|
| Memorial Coliseum
| 21–22
|- align="center" bgcolor="#ccffcc"
| 44
| January 6
| Detroit
| W 110–90
|
|
|
| Memorial Coliseum
| 22–22
|- align="center" bgcolor="#ffcccc"
| 45
| January 9
| @ San Antonio
| L 86–102
|
|
|
| HemisFair Arena
| 22–23
|- align="center" bgcolor="#ffcccc"
| 46
| January 10
| @ Houston
| L 105–106
|
|
|
| The Summit
| 22–24
|- align="center" bgcolor="#ccffcc"
| 47
| January 14
| @ Kansas City
| W 110–91
|
|
|
| Kemper Arena
| 23–24
|- align="center" bgcolor="#ccffcc"
| 48
| January 16
| @ Chicago
| W 113–112
|
|
|
| Chicago Stadium
| 24–24
|- align="center" bgcolor="#ffcccc"
| 49
| January 18
| @ Milwaukee
| L 103–110
|
|
|
| MECCA Arena
| 24–25
|- align="center" bgcolor="#ffcccc"
| 50
| January 20
| @ Cleveland
| L 94–99
|
|
|
| Richfield Coliseum
| 24–26
|- align="center" bgcolor="#ccffcc"
| 51
| January 23
| New York
| W 117–90
|
|
|
| Memorial Coliseum
| 25–26
|- align="center" bgcolor="#ccffcc"
| 52
| January 25
| San Antonio
| W 118–100
|
|
|
| Memorial Coliseum
| 26–26
|- align="center" bgcolor="#ffcccc"
| 53
| January 26
| @ Los Angeles
| L 112–124
|
|
|
| The Forum
| 26–27
|- align="center" bgcolor="#ccffcc"
| 54
| January 29
| @ San Diego
| W 108–106
|
|
|
| San Diego Sports Arena
| 27–27

|- align="center" bgcolor="#ccffcc"
| 55
| February 3
| Washington
| W 111–104 (OT)
|
|
|
| Memorial Coliseum
| 28–27
|- align="center" bgcolor="#ffcccc"
| 56
| February 4
| @ Golden State
| L 100–115
|
|
|
| Oakland–Alameda County Coliseum Arena
| 28–28
|- align="center" bgcolor="#ffcccc"
| 57
| February 6
| @ San Antonio
| L 96–122
|
|
|
| HemisFair Arena
| 28–29
|- align="center" bgcolor="#ccffcc"
| 58
| February 8
| Kansas City
| W 129–123 (OT)
|
|
|
| Memorial Coliseum
| 29–29
|- align="center" bgcolor="#ffcccc"
| 59
| February 12
| Seattle
| L 109–112
|
|
|
| Memorial Coliseum
| 29–30
|- align="center" bgcolor="#ffcccc"
| 60
| February 13
| @ Denver
| L 143–162
|
|
|
| McNichols Sports Arena
| 29–31
|- align="center" bgcolor="#ccffcc"
| 61
| February 15
| Utah
| W 118–84
|
|
|
| Memorial Coliseum
| 30–31
|- align="center" bgcolor="#ccffcc"
| 62
| February 17
| @ Washington
| W 124–104
|
|
|
| Capital Centre
| 31–31
|- align="center" bgcolor="#ccffcc"
| 63
| February 19
| @ Detroit
| W 115–106
|
|
|
| Pontiac Silverdome
| 32–31
|- align="center" bgcolor="#ffcccc"
| 64
| February 20
| @ New Jersey
| L 113–123
|
|
|
| Rutgers Athletic Center
| 32–32
|- align="center" bgcolor="#ccffcc"
| 65
| February 22
| @ Indiana
| W 113–109 (OT)
|
|
|
| Market Square Arena
| 33–32
|- align="center" bgcolor="#ffcccc"
| 66
| February 24
| San Diego
| L 107–121
|
|
|
| Memorial Coliseum
| 33–33
|- align="center" bgcolor="#ccffcc"
| 67
| February 27
| Phoenix
| W 121–117
|
|
|
| Memorial Coliseum
| 34–33

|- align="center" bgcolor="#ccffcc"
| 68
| March 1
| Utah
| W 108–97
|
|
|
| Memorial Coliseum
| 35–33
|- align="center" bgcolor="#ccffcc"
| 69
| March 3
| Indiana
| W 117–112
|
|
|
| Memorial Coliseum
| 36–33
|- align="center" bgcolor="#ffcccc"
| 70
| March 5
| @ Kansas City
| L 100–106
|
|
|
| Kemper Arena
| 36–34
|- align="center" bgcolor="#ffcccc"
| 71
| March 6
| @ Phoenix
| L 107–128
|
|
|
| Arizona Veterans Memorial Coliseum
| 36–35
|- align="center" bgcolor="#ccffcc"
| 72
| March 8
| Golden State
| W 120–112 (OT)
|
|
|
| Memorial Coliseum
| 37–35
|- align="center" bgcolor="#ccffcc"
| 73
| March 10
| @ Denver
| W 142–137
|
|
|
| McNichols Sports Arena
| 38–35
|- align="center" bgcolor="#ffcccc"
| 74
| March 13
| @ Houston
| L 104–126
|
|
|
| The Summit
| 38–36
|- align="center" bgcolor="#ccffcc"
| 75
| March 15
| Dallas
| W 135–110
|
|
|
| Memorial Coliseum
| 39–36
|- align="center" bgcolor="#ccffcc"
| 76
| March 17
| San Diego
| W 127–112
|
|
|
| Memorial Coliseum
| 40–36
|- align="center" bgcolor="#ccffcc"
| 77
| March 20
| Houston
| W 107–103
|
|
|
| Memorial Coliseum
| 41–36
|- align="center" bgcolor="#ffcccc"
| 78
| March 21
| Los Angeles
| L 111–117
|
|
|
| Memorial Coliseum
| 41–37
|- align="center" bgcolor="#ccffcc"
| 79
| March 24
| Phoenix
| W 120–111
|
|
|
| Memorial Coliseum
| 42–37
|- align="center" bgcolor="#ccffcc"
| 80
| March 25
| @ Seattle
| W 112–103
|
|
|
| Kingdome
| 43–37
|- align="center" bgcolor="#ccffcc"
| 81
| March 27
| @ Dallas
| W 123–109
|
|
|
| Reunion Arena
| 44–37
|- align="center" bgcolor="#ccffcc"
| 82
| March 29
| @ San Diego
| W 144–129
|
|
|
| San Diego Sports Arena
| 45–37

Playoffs

|- align="center" bgcolor="#ffcccc"
| 1
| April 1
| Kansas City
| L 97–98 (OT)
| Billy Ray Bates (25)
| Kermit Washington (17)
| Kelvin Ransey (10)
| Memorial Coliseum12,666
| 0–1
|- align="center" bgcolor="#ccffcc"
| 2
| April 3
| @ Kansas City
| W 124–119 (OT)
| Mychal Thompson (40)
| Kermit Washington (18)
| Kelvin Ransey (7)
| Kemper Arena11,088
| 1–1
|- align="center" bgcolor="#ffcccc"
| 3
| April 5
| Kansas City
| L 95–104
| Billy Ray Bates (34)
| Kermit Washington (17)
| Kelvin Ransey (8)
| Memorial Coliseum12,666
| 1–2
|-

Player statistics

Season

Playoffs

Awards and honors
 Kelvin Ransey, All-NBA Rookie Team
 Kermit Washington, NBA All-Defensive Second Team

Transactions
July 21, 1980
 Waived Charles Jones
August 15, 1980
 Traded T. R. Dunn and a first round pick in the 1983 NBA draft to the Denver Nuggets in exchange for a 1983 first round draft pick and a second round pick in the 1984 NBA draft. Denver drafted Howard Carter and the Trail Blazers selected Clyde Drexler in 1983 and Steve Colter in 1984.
September 24, 1980
 Signed free agent Roy Hamilton
October 8, 1980
 Traded Jim Brewer to the Los Angeles Lakers in exchange for the a second round draft pick in the 1984 NBA draft. During the draft the Trail Blazers had the option to swap first round picks with the Lakers but declined. Portland selected Jerome Kersey with the Lakers pick.
October 13, 1980
 Waived Roy Hamilton
December 19, 1980
 Traded Ron Brewer to the San Antonio Spurs in exchange for Mike Gale and a first round pick in the 1982 NBA draft. The Trail Blazers later traded that pick which the Detroit Pistons used to select Ricky Pierce.
February 2, 1981
 Signed free agent Geoff Crompton
June 5, 1981
 Traded Tom Owens to the Indiana Pacers in exchange for a first round pick in the 1984 NBA draft. Portland selected Sam Bowie with the pick.
June 8, 1981
 Traded Mike Gale to the Golden State Warriors in exchange for a second round pick in 1982 NBA draft and a 1985 second round pick. In 1982 Portland selected Audie Norris and Mike Smrek was chosen in 1985.

References

Portland Trail Blazers seasons
Portland Trail Blazers 1980
Portland Trail Blazers 1980
Po
Portland
Portland